Wilsall is a census-designated place (CDP) in Park County, Montana, United States. The population was 237 at the 2000 census.

Description
Wilsall takes its name from Will Jordan, of the Jordan-Robertson Company cattle ranch, and his wife, Sally. The Northern Pacific Railway line arrived in December 1909, and the post office opened a year later.

Geography

Climate
This climatic region is typified by large seasonal temperature differences, with warm to hot (and often humid) summers and cold (sometimes severely cold) winters.  According to the Köppen Climate Classification system, Wilsall has a humid continental climate, abbreviated "Dfb" on climate maps.

Demographics

As of the census of 2000, there were 237 people, 102 households, and 68 families residing in the CDP. The population density was 234.5 people per square mile (90.6/km2). There were 119 housing units at an average density of 117.7 per square mile (45.5/km2). The racial makeup of the CDP was 95.36% White, 1.69% Native American, 2.95% from other races. Hispanic or Latino of any race were 2.95% of the population.

There were 102 households, out of which 25.5% had children under the age of 18 living with them, 55.9% were married couples living together, 7.8% had a female householder with no husband present, and 33.3% were non-families. 28.4% of all households were made up of individuals, and 9.8% had someone living alone who was 65 years of age or older. The average household size was 2.32 and the average family size was 2.85.

In the CDP, the population was spread out, with 23.6% under the age of 18, 4.6% from 18 to 24, 23.2% from 25 to 44, 28.7% from 45 to 64, and 19.8% who were 65 years of age or older. The median age was 44 years. For every 100 females, there were 94.3 males. For every 100 females age 18 and over, there were 94.6 males.

The median income for a household in the CDP was $29,643, and the median income for a family was $30,357. Males had a median income of $28,000 versus $21,607 for females. The per capita income for the CDP was $14,585. About 16.7% of families and 17.9% of the population were below the poverty line, including 30.9% of those under the age of eighteen and 2.6% of those 65 or over.

Education
Shields Valley Public Schools educates students from kindergarten through 12th grade. The elementary school is in Wilsall. The Jr/Sr High School is located in Clyde Park. The Shields Valley High School team name is the Rebels.

Notable people
Notable residents include Dirk Adams, owner of the Lazy SR Ranch and the Wilsall General Store.

See also

 List of census-designated places in Montana

References

External links

Census-designated places in Park County, Montana
Census-designated places in Montana